The 2010–11 season will be Persepolis's 10th season in the Pro League, and their 28th consecutive season in the top division of Iranian football. They will also be competing in the Hazfi Cup and AFC Champions League.

Competitions

Overall

Squad

Iran Pro League Squad

Retirement
 6    MF   Karim Bagheri retired from football during the season.

2010–11 Iran Pro League

Persepolis schedule 

Last updated 20 May 2011

Results by round

Results summary

League standings

Scorers and assistants

Goalscorers

Goalassistants

Cards

Matches played 
32 Matches
  Maziar Zare

31 Matches
  Mohammad Nouri

29 Matches
  Hadi Norouzi

2010–11 Hazfi Cup

Last updated 10 June 2011

Scorers in Hazfi Cup

Goalscorers

Goalassistants 

4 Assists
  Mohammad Nouri

2 Assists
  Amir Hossein Feshangchi

1 Assist
  Hadi Norouzi
  Mojtaba Shiri
  Ebrahim Shakouri

Cards

2011 Champions League

Group C

Persepolis schedule ACL 2011

Scorers in Champions League 2011

Goalscorers

Goalassistants 

1 Assists
  Mohammad Nouri
  Hamidreza Aliasgari

Cards

Friendly Matches

Pre Season

 24 June 2010
Ardebil Azad University 1-4 Persepolis  
Ardebil Azad University 1-4 Persepolis  
Alireza Mohammad  
Hadi Norouzi  
Saeed Hallafi 

 4 July 2010
 SuS Kaiserau 1920 e.V.  1-7 Persepolis  
Maziar Zare  
Hadi Norouzi  
Tiago Alves Fraga  
Amir Hossein Feshangchi  
Gholamreza Rezaei  
Mohammad Nouri  
Own Goal 

 6 July 2010
 Dortmund XI 1-5 Persepolis  
Shpejtim Arifi  
Hadi Norouzi  
Alireza Noormohammadi  
Mohammad Nouri 

 8 July 2010
 Vfk Weddinghofen 1-11 Persepolis  
Shpejtim Arifi  
Hossein Badamaki  
Gholamreza Rezaei  
Mojtaba Zarei  
Amir Hossein Feshangchi  
Mohammad Nouri 
Hervé Oussalé 

 15 July 2010
Persepolis 2-0 Persepolis Qaem Shahr
Mohammad Nouri 
Maziar Zare 

 18 July 2010
Paykan 1-0 Persepolis 

 21 July 2010
Persepolis 5-0 Niroye Zamini
Alireza Mohammad  
Tiago Alves Fraga   
Karim Bagheri  
Mojtaba Zarei

During Season 

*The match against Eintracht finished 1-1, but in penalty shootout Eintracht won 3-1.

Club

Kit 

|
|
|

Club managers

Club officials

Captains 
1.  Sepehr Heidari
2.  Vahid Hashemian
3.  Maziar Zare
4.  Hossein Badamaki
5.  Mojtaba Shiri

Squad changes during 2010–11 season

In

Out

References

2010-11
Iranian football clubs 2010–11 season